Bicyclus milyas, the lesser rock bush brown, is a butterfly in the family Nymphalidae. It is found in Senegal, the Gambia, Guinea-Bissau, Mali, Guinea, Burkina Faso, northern Sierra Leone, northern Ivory Coast, northern Ghana, northern Togo, northern Benin, northern Nigeria, the northern part of the Democratic Republic of the Congo, Sudan, northern Uganda, south-western Ethiopia and Kenya. The habitat consists of dry savanna.

The larvae feed on Imperata cylindrica and Pennisetum purpureum.

References

Elymniini
Butterflies described in 1864
Butterflies of Africa
Taxa named by William Chapman Hewitson